Slavoljub Srnić (born 12 January 1992) is a Serbian professional footballer who plays as a winger. He is a twin brother of Dragoljub Srnić. He is currently performing for Red Star Belgrade.

Club career

Red Star Belgrade
Srnić was molded in Red Star's youth system, and some observers in Serbian football had referred to young Slavoljub as "Ognjen Koroman's student". Coach Aleksandar Kristić selected Srnić to make his professional debut for Red Star Belgrade on 6 November 2010 in a SuperLiga match against OFK Beograd. The Srnić brothers were then loaned to Red Star's farm team, FK Sopot. Subsequently, Slavoljub and Dragoljub were loaned to Čukarički, where they enjoyed much more playing time and success.

Čukarički
During the loan spell at Čukarički from Red Star, Slavoljub was named by Mozzart Sport as the most valuable player of the Serbian First League. After the loan expired, Slavoljub and his brother refused to return to Red Star Belgrade, and after many problems, they were sold to Čukarički in June 2013.

In part due to Srnić's contributions, Čukarički returned to the Serbian top flight for the 2013-14 season, when Srnić terminated his contract with Red Star due to unpaid salary and became a permanent Čukarički player. On 6 October 2013, in a match between Čukarički and Srnić's former club Red Star, Srnić made an assist 17 seconds into the game and scored a goal in the second half. Not by coincidence, Srnić earned the first international call-up in his career the following day.

Return to Red Star Belgrade
On 31 August 2015, Slavoljub returned to Red Star, signing a three-year contract. Red Star's coach Miodrag Božović had insisted on Srnić's return throughout the summer. Including his first period with the club, Srnić noted his 100 match for Red Star Belgrade in a match against Vojvodina on 7 March 2018.

Las Palmas
On 29 January 2019, Srnić moved abroad for the first time in his career after agreeing to a two-and-a-half-year contract with Segunda División side UD Las Palmas. On 5 October of the following year, he terminated his contract with the club.

International career
Srnić was called up by coach Radovan Ćurčić to replace an injured Lazar Marković by Serbia U21 on 7 October 2013 for the 2015 UEFA European U21 Championship qualifying campaign, but did not make his debut in the games he was called up for. He finally made his debut on 9 September 2014, in a 4–1 win against Northern Ireland U21, scoring two goals.

Career statistics

Club

Honours

Club
Čukarički
Serbian Cup: 2014–15

Red Star Belgrade
 Serbian SuperLiga (5): 2015–16, 2017–18, 2018–19, 2020–21, 2021–22
 Serbian Cup (2): 2020–21, 2021–22

References

External links
 
 Early career at Srbijafudbal.
 Slavoljub Srnić Stats at Utakmica.rs

 

1992 births
Living people
Sportspeople from Šabac
Serbian footballers
Association football wingers
Serbian SuperLiga players
FK Mačva Šabac players
Red Star Belgrade footballers
FK Čukarički players
Segunda División players
UD Las Palmas players
Serbia under-21 international footballers
Serbian expatriate footballers
Serbian expatriate sportspeople in Spain
Expatriate footballers in Spain